Shura is the name of several rural localities in Russia:
Shura, Kirov Oblast, a village in Podgortsevsky Rural Okrug of Yuryansky District in Kirov Oblast; 
Shura, Mari El Republic, a village in Pektubayevsky Rural Okrug of Novotoryalsky District in the Mari El Republic; 
Shura, Republic of Tatarstan, a selo in Arsky District of the Republic of Tatarstan